"Beaver Gets 'Spelled" is the premiere episode of the iconic American television series Leave It to Beaver (1957–1963). The episode aired on CBS on October 4, 1957. The episode is the first episode in the first season, and the first episode in the complete series. "Beaver Gets 'Spelled" is available on DVD.

Plot summary

Beaver's new teacher, Miss Canfield, gives him a note after class to take home. Beaver's classmates convince him that the note means he is going to be kicked out of school. Worried that he will be the first second-grader in the school's history to be "'spelled" (expelled), Beaver hides the note.

The next day, Miss Canfield finds the note under Beaver's desk and instructs him to take it home. Beaver loses the note on the way home. Wally helps Beaver in his predicament by writing a note (from "Mrs. Ward Cleaver") to Miss Canfield assuring her that Beaver has been whipped for his offense. The next day, Miss Canfield is at a loss trying to understand such a severe response to her request that Beaver play Smokey the Bear in a school pageant. She calls June to the school. When Beaver discovers where his mother is headed, he runs away and climbs a tree. When Ward, June, and Wally find Beaver in the tree, they are unable to persuade him to come down. June decides to leave him there even if it rains. Beaver comes down to get his raincoat. The next day, he has a talk with Miss Canfield and asks her to call him "Beaver" rather than "Theodore". He offers her some tips on understanding second-graders. The following day, Beaver leaves for school carrying his most precious object for Miss Canfield — a rubber shrunken head.

Cast and crew
Hugh Beaumont and Barbara Billingsley star as archetypal suburban couple, Ward and June Cleaver with Tony Dow and Jerry Mathers as their sons, Wally and Theodore "Beaver" Cleaver. Diane Brewster plays Miss Canfield, Beaver's teacher, with Doris Packer playing Grant Avenue Grammar School principal, Mrs. Rayburn. Jeri Weil and Stanley Fafara play Beaver's classmates, Judy Hensler and "Whitey" Whitney respectively while Burt Mustin and Ralph Sanford play Beaver's adult friends in the neighborhood, Gus, the fireman, and "Fats" Flannaghan, a junkyard operator. Steve Paylow appeared as the boy who informs the Cleavers about Beaver's whereabouts, while Gary Allen as First Man and Alan Reynolds as Second Man are onlookers in the scene where Beaver climbs a tree. The episode was written by the show's creators, Joe Connelly and Bob Mosher, and directed by Norman Tokar.

Production notes
 The episode was third in production order (following "Captain Jack" 901A and "The Black Eye" 902A) but became the premiere episode.
 "Whitey" Whitney (Stanley Fafara) is addressed as Harold by Miss Canfield. This is the only time he is called by any other name besides "Whitey" until the final season episode 232 ("Beaver Sees America") when he is called Hubert.
 The episode, and thus the series, happened to air the day Sputnik 1 was launched.

See also
 List of Leave It to Beaver episodes

References
 Applebaum, Irwyn. The World According to Beaver. TV Books, 1984, 1998..
 Bank, Frank. Call Me Lumpy: my Leave It To Beaver days and other wild Hollywood life . Addax, 2002.,.
 Colella, Jennifer. The Leave It to Beaver Guide to Life: wholesome wisdom from the Cleavers! Running Press, 2006.,.
 Leave It to Beaver: the complete first season. Universal Studios, 2005.
 Leave It to Beaver: the complete second season. Universal Studios, 2006.
 Mathers, Jerry. ...And Jerry Mather as "The Beaver". Berkley Boulevard Books, 1998.

External links
 Leave It to Beaver, a Titles and Air Dates Guide

Leave It to Beaver episodes
1957 American television episodes